People's League may refer to any of the following political movements:
the British Independent Parliamentary Group
the Canadian People's League
the Romanian People's Party